"Better Off Without You" is a song by American country singer Jake Hoot. It is Hoot's coronation song following his victory on the seventeenth season of The Voice. It was written by himself.

Background
The song is co-written by Jake Hoot and Dave Pahanish, who also initially produced the song. According to Hoot, he wrote the song in a dark period while going through a divorce from his wife. He said: "That was my lowest point. I was sitting there one night. I thought of the lyric, 'I can see the thunder and hear the dark.'" However, he said that the song is not a slight on his ex-wife, as his co-write Pahanish came up with the title of the song and he used the line for the song.

The song was first released as a single in May 2019 before he appeared on The Voice.  Hoot performed the song in the finale of The Voice, and his performance was well-received by the coaches on the show.  It was re-released after he performed the song.

Charts

References

2019 singles
2019 songs
Country ballads
Republic Records singles